Blockade of Gaza may refer to

 Blockade of the Gaza Strip
 2006–2007 economic sanctions against the Palestinian National Authority, including blockade.
 For the ancient siege of Gaza, see Siege of Gaza.